The 1996–97 Honduran Liga Nacional season was the 31st edition of the Honduran Liga Nacional.  The format of the tournament remained the same as the previous season.  Club Deportivo Olimpia won the title after defeating C.D. Platense in the finals.  Both teams qualified to the 1998 CONCACAF Champions' Cup.  This was the last long-season tournament before the introduction of the Apertura and Clausura format.

1996–97 teams

 Independiente Villela
 Marathón
 Motagua
 Olimpia
 Platense
 Real España
 Real Maya
 Universidad (promoted)
 Victoria
 Vida

Regular season

Standings

Results (Rounds 1–18)

 Marathón–Olimpia abandoned at '70 (1–2).  Result stood.

Results (Rounds 19–27)

Final round

Hexagonal

 Real España won 3–2 on aggregated.

 Victoria 2–2 Marathón on aggregated.  Victoria advanced on better Regular season record.

 Platense won 4–3 on aggregated.

Triangular

Final

 Olimpia won 4–1 on aggregated.

Top scorer
  Denilson Costa (Motagua) with 13 goals

Squads

Controversies
 On 12 October 1996, during a week 7 match between C.D. Marathón and Club Deportivo Olimpia, then Marathón's president José Yacamán ordered his team to quit the game as he claimed that they were being targeted by referee Arturo Tábora with controversial calls.  The game was not resumed and the result stood 1–2 to Olimpia.
 In the last round, C.D. Motagua defeated Independiente Villela at Tegucigalpa with a 7–2 score.  This game sentenced Independiente to certain relegation.  However, the Chorizeros protested that Motagua had included defender Júnior Izaguirre in its lineup.  Izaguirre, who was on the bench that day, saw a red card in a reserves game a week prior.  In order to avoid further conflicts, the league decided to abolish relegation and invited Independiente to play in the 1997–98 season.

References

Liga Nacional de Fútbol Profesional de Honduras seasons
1996–97 in Honduran football
Honduras